Petr Sýkora (born December 21, 1978) is a Czech former ice hockey player. He played 12 games in the National Hockey League with the Nashville Predators and Washington Capitals between 1999 and 2005. The rest of his career, which lasted from 1998 to 2020, was mainly spent in the Czech Extraliga. Internationally he played for the Czech national team at the 2007 World Championships. He is the younger brother of former NHL defenceman Michal Sýkora.

Playing career
Sýkora was drafted by the Detroit Red Wings in the 1997 NHL Entry Draft in the 3rd round, 76th overall. On July 14, 1998, the Red Wings traded him (along with future considerations and a third-round pick in the 1999 NHL Entry Draft) to the Nashville Predators for Doug Brown. Sýkora suited up for two games for the Predators in the 1998–99 season and did not play in the NHL again until the 2005–06 NHL season. That season, he played ten games for the Washington Capitals, ultimately leaving the United States after finding the cultural transition difficult.

In his time away from the NHL, Sýkora played for HC Pardubice in the Czech Extraliga and HC Davos of the Swiss Nationalliga A.

Career statistics

Regular season and playoffs

International

External links
 

1978 births
Living people
Czech ice hockey centres
Detroit Red Wings draft picks
HC Davos players
HC Dynamo Pardubice players
Milwaukee Admirals (IHL) players
Nashville Predators players
Sportspeople from Pardubice
Washington Capitals players
Czech expatriate ice hockey players in Switzerland
Czech expatriate ice hockey players in the United States